Kalvitis is a surname. Notable people with the surname include:

Aigars Kalvītis (born 1966), Latvian businessman and politician
David Kalvitis, American artist and graphic designer